Maria de Fátima Gomes Nogueira (born Rio de Janeiro, 27 January 1957), better known as Joanna, is a Brazilian singer.

Discography

 1979: Nascente – RCA Victor 
 1980: Estrela Guia – RCA Victor 
 1981: Chama – RCA Victor 
 1982: Vidamor – RCA Victor 
 1983: Brilho e paixão''' – RCA Victor 
 1984: Joanna – RCA Victor 
 1985: Joanna – RCA Victor 
 1986: Joanna – RCA Victor 
 1988: Joanna – BMG Ariola 
 1989: Primaveras e verões – BMG Ariola 
 1991: Joanna – BMG Ariola 
 1993: Alma, coração e vida – BMG Ariola 
 1994: Joanna canta Lupicínio – BMG Ariola
 1995: Sempre no meu coração – BMG Ariola 
 1997: Joanna em Samba-Canção – BMG Ariola 
 1998: Intimidad (Spanish album) – BMG Ariola
 1999: Joanna 20 Anos (ao vivo) – BMG Ariola 
 2001: Eu estou bem – BMG Ariola 
 2002: Joanna em Oração (ao vivo) – Sony Music 
 2003: Todo Acústico – Sony Music 
 2004: Joanna 25 anos entre Amigos – Sony Music 
 2006: Joanna ao vivo em Portugal – Universal Music 
 2007: Joanna em Pintura Íntima ao vivo'- Som Livre
 2011: Em Nome de Jesus – Joanna Interpreta Padre Zezinho'' –

References

External links
 

1957 births
Living people
20th-century Brazilian women singers
20th-century Brazilian singers
21st-century Brazilian women singers
21st-century Brazilian singers